Sympycnodes salterra is a species of moth of the family Cossidae. It is found in Australia, where it has been recorded from northern New South Wales, Queensland and Western Australia. The habitat consists of dry woodland.

The wingspan is 27–38 mm for males and 37 mm for females. The forewings are cream to pale grey with scattered red-brown scales and three small brown dark brown spots surrounded by pale scales. Adults have been recorded from August to February.

Etymology
The species is named in honour of Mr. Edward Edwards and Dr. Marianne Horak and is derived from salterra (meaning salt of the earth).

References

Moths described in 2012
Zeuzerinae